The World's Most Dangerous Places is handbook of survival tactics for high-risk regions first published in 1994, written by National Geographic Adventure columnist Robert Young Pelton and his contributors. The fifth edition was published in 2003.

Summary
The book is divided into three parts.

The first is a primer on the basics of staying safe in war zones and high-crime areas. This includes safety advice regarding transportation, crime, terrorism, bribery, disease, drugs, weapons, kidnappings, land mines, mercenaries, and more.

The second is essentially a chapter-by-chapter list of dangerous locales. Each nation or autonomous administrative division is assigned a rating depending on the level and type of danger.

The third section contains the authors' first-hand stories of traveling through the listed places.

Bibliography

The Best American Travel Writing
Best Adventure and Travel Stories
Boots on the Ground

References

1994 non-fiction books
Adventure travel
Travel books